Saint Peter in Chains Cathedral may refer to:

Cathedral of Saint Peter-in-Chains, Peterborough, Ontario, Canada
Cathedral Basilica of Saint Peter in Chains (Cincinnati), United States